Ali Fazıl Kasap is a Turkish medical doctor, senator and academician.

He is a member of the Turkish National Assembly and the Medical Commission of the Turkish National Assembly since 2018.

Life and career 
He was born on February 1, 1965, in Şeyhler, in Emet district in Kütahya. He completed his primary, secondary and high school education in Kütahya. He graduated from the Dokuz Eylül University Faculty of Medicine. He completed his compulsory service as a physician in Burdur-Yeşilova-Salda Health Center.

After completing his education at Selçuk University Faculty of Medicine and Pediatrics, he became a model in Kütahya Hospital and established the Private Physician Sinan Medical Center, which was closed to the public in 2006; it reopened in 2014.

In the 2018 Turkey general election, he also took part in the CHP Family and Social Affairs Commission of the Grand National Assembly of Turkey. He is currently serving as a Member of Parliament for Kütahya.

References 

Turkish physicians
1965 births
Living people